Francien Huurman (born 18 April 1975 in Pijnacker, South Holland) is a volleyball player from the Netherlands, who plays as a middle-blocker. She was a member of the Dutch National Women's Team that won the gold medal at the FIVB World Grand Prix 2007 in Ningbo, PR China.

On 21 November 2011 Hitachi Rivale announced her joining.

References

External links
 FIVB Profile
 Profile 

1975 births
Living people
Dutch women's volleyball players
People from Pijnacker-Nootdorp
Middle blockers
Expatriate volleyball players in Japan
Dutch expatriate sportspeople in Japan
Sportspeople from South Holland